Joellen Louise Russell (born 1970) is an American oceanographer and climate scientist.

Russell is a professor in the Department of Geosciences at the University of Arizona. In Tucson, AZ, with joint appointments in the Departments of Lunar and Planetary Sciences, Hydrology and Atmospheric Sciences, and in the Mathematics Department’s Program in Applied Mathematics. She was named as the Thomas R. Brown Distinguished Chair of Integrative Science in 2017. She was named as University Distinguish Professor in 2021.

Early life and education 

Russell was born in Seattle, WA in 1970, and grew up in Kotzebue, Alaska, a fishing village 30 miles north of the Arctic Circle, where her father worked for the Indian Health Service. At age 12, she knew she wanted to be an oceanographer. Russell attended St. Paul’s School in Concord, NH, received a School Year Abroad in Rennes, France, was a Radcliffe National Scholar at Harvard University where she earned an A.B. in Environmental Geoscience. She had her first research cruise to the Southern Ocean in 1994 and spent nearly a year of her graduate career at sea there before completing her PhD in Oceanography in 1999 from the Scripps Institution of Oceanography, University of California, San Diego. She earned a JISAO Postdoctoral Fellowship at the University of Washington and then spent several years as a research scientist at Princeton University and the NOAA Geophysical Fluid Dynamics Laboratory in Princeton, NJ during the preparation for the 4th Assessment by the Intergovernmental Panel on Climate Change (IPCC-AR4). Russell became a member of the faculty of the Department of Geosciences at the University of Arizona in 2006, and became a full professor in 2019.

Career and impact of research 

Russell’s research explores the role of the ocean in the global climate, focusing on the Southern Ocean and the Southern Hemisphere westerly winds. She uses global climate and earth system models to simulate the climate and carbon cycle of the past, the present and the future, and develops observationally-based metrics to evaluate these simulations. Russell's work on the westerly winds led to her greatest research accomplishment so far: the creation of a new paradigm in climate science, namely that warmer climates produce stronger westerly winds. This insight solved one of the long-standing climate paradoxes, the mechanism responsible for transferring one-third of the carbon dioxide in the atmosphere into the ocean and then back out again during our repeated glacial-interglacial cycles.

Russell is the lead for the modeling theme of the Southern Ocean Carbon and Climate Observations and Modeling project (SOCCOM) including its Southern Ocean Model Intercomparison Project (SOMIP)

She currently serves as the Chair of the NOAA Science Advisory Board’s Climate Working Group, as an Objective Leader for the Scientific Committee on Antarctic Research’s AntarcticClimate21, and on the National Center for Atmospheric Research (NCAR) Community Earth System Model (CESM) advisory board.

Russell is one of founding members of Science Moms, a nonpartisan group of climate scientists, who are also mothers, working to demystify climate change.

Impact 

Russell is one of the 14 climate scientists behind an amicus curiae brief supporting the plaintiff in the historic 2007 U.S. Supreme Court decision on carbon dioxide emissions and climate change, Commonwealth of Massachusetts, et al. v. U.S. Environmental Protection Agency. This amicus brief was the only one cited in this landmark decision that established that carbon dioxide is an atmospheric pollutant and that the EPA must regulate it.

Awards and recognition 

 2021 – University Distinguished Professor, University of Arizona
2017–present – Thomas R. Brown Distinguished Chair of Integrative Science
 2014 – 1885 Society Distinguished Scholar Award, University of Arizona
 2012–present – Member, Comer Family Foundation “Changelings” group
 2011-2012 – Distinguished Lecturer, American Association of Petroleum Geologists
 2010 – Provost’s General Education Teaching Award, University of Arizona
 1989-1993 – Radcliffe National Scholar, Harvard University, Cambridge, MA

References

External links 
 IPCC, 2021: Climate Change 2021: The Physical Science Basis. Contribution of Working Group I to the Sixth Assessment Report of the Intergovernmental Panel on Climate Change [Masson-Delmotte, V., P. Zhai, A. Pirani, S.L. Connors, C. Péan, S. Berger, N. Caud, Y. Chen, L. Goldfarb, M.I. Gomis, M. Huang, K. Leitzell, E. Lonnoy, J.B.R. Matthews, T.K. Maycock, T. Waterfield, O. Yelekçi, R. Yu, and B. Zhou (eds.)]. Cambridge University Press. In Press.
IPCC, 2013: Climate Change 2013: The Physical Science Basis. Contribution of Working Group I to the Fifth Assessment Report of the Intergovernmental Panel on Climate Change [Stocker, T.F., D. Qin, G.-K. Plattner, M. Tignor, S.K. Allen, J. Boschung, A. Nauels, Y. Xia, V. Bex and P.M. Midgley (eds.)]. Cambridge University Press, Cambridge, United Kingdom and New York, NY, USA, 1535 pp.
IPCC, 2007: Climate Change 2007: The Physical Science Basis. Contribution of Working Group I to the Fourth Assessment Report of the Intergovernmental Panel on Climate Change [Solomon, S., D. Qin, M. Manning, Z. Chen, M. Marquis, K.B. Averyt, M. Tignor and H.L. Miller (eds.)]. Cambridge University Press, Cambridge, United Kingdom and New York, NY, USA, 996 pp.

1970 births
American climatologists
American oceanographers
University of Arizona faculty
Women climatologists
Women oceanographers
Scripps Institution of Oceanography alumni
Harvard College alumni
Living people